Bombala is a town in the Monaro region of south-eastern New South Wales, Australia, in Snowy Monaro Regional Council. The name derives from an Aboriginal word meaning "Meeting of the waters". The town lies on the banks of the Bombala River.

History

The Bombala area was inhabited by the Ngarigu Aboriginal people prior to the first European settlers arriving in the 1830s. Captain Ronald Campbell established a large property in 1833 that he named 'Bombalo'.  More European settlers arrived in the Bombala area in the 1840s during which time the small township developed. Bombala had a post office by 1849 and had a number of large commercial and public buildings by the mid 1850s.

Bombala was proposed in 1903 by King O'Malley as the site of the parliamentary seat of Australia. It was considered as a location because it was halfway between the two cities of Sydney and Melbourne.  The proposal was ultimately rejected in favour of Canberra. The site proposed for the capital city was a little to the west of the town of Bombala, on the right bank of the Bombala River. The town of Bombala would have been a part of a new federal territory.

The town lies on the banks of the Bombala River and principal industries of the area include grazing and timber. Tourism is also growing in importance to the local economy.  There is also a small amount of specialty producers with meat rabbits, lavender and many herbs being grown in the district. Delegate is situated 36 km west of Bombala and The Snowy River March which commenced from Delegate in 1916 went via Bombala to Goulburn.

On 13 December 1962, Bombala post office received the last telegram to be transmitted using Morse code telegraphy in New South Wales.

The area is known for possibly the largest population of Platypus in New South Wales and is promoted as Platypus Country.

The Holy Transfiguration Monastery is a male monastic community of the Russian Orthodox Church Abroad. Founded in 1982, the monastic community presided over by Abbott Hieromonk Sergius, abides in the pristine and rugged valley of the MacLaughlin River situated between Cooma and Bombala.

The Facebook page "Bombala History in Photos" contains a wealth of information about the town's history.

On January 15, 2022, a tornado touched down in the vicinity of the town.

Heritage listings 
Bombala has a number of heritage-listed sites, including:
 Goulburn-Bombala railway: Bombala railway station
 91 Main Road: Crankies Plain Bridge

Population
In the 2016 Census, there were 1,387 people in Bombala. 85.1% of people were born in Australia and 89.9% of people spoke only English at home. The most common responses for religion were Anglican 34.6%, Catholic 23.8% and No Religion 20.3%.

Geography and climate

Situated at 705 metres above sea level on the eastern edge of the Monaro Tablelands, Bombala is known for its cold winters with frequent frost and occasional snow—however due to its downwind position on the Great Dividing Range, winters are relatively warm and dry for its latitude and snowfall insignificant. A few kilometres to the east, the land slopes downwards to the South Coast, a flat coastal plain where summers are warmer and winter temperatures much milder. Examples are towns such as Bega and Merimbula, both about 80 kilometres east of Bombala. According to Köppen climate classification scheme, Bombala has an oceanic climate (Cfb).

Most rain in the area falls as either thunderstorms in summer, or with cold fronts in winter. Extreme temperatures have ranged from 40.7 °C (105.6 °F) to −10.0 °C (14.0 °F).

Transport

The railway reached Bombala in 1921 and closed in 1986. being an extension of the line from Queanbeyan to Cooma. The line was and still is known as the Goulburn to Bombala line.

The Monaro Highway (now route B23) which runs from Canberra to Cann River (Victoria) passes through Bombala. 
Other major roads include Mt Darragh Rd which connects to Pambula and Merimbula on the NSW South Coast.

The nearest airport with regular air services is at Merimbula,  to the east.

Notable residents
 Minard Crommelin MBE (1881-1972), postmistress and environmental conservationist, born at Aston Station, near Bombala.
 Michael Farrell (1965-), contemporary poet and magazine editor, born in Bombala.
 Sir Alexander George William "Bill" Keys AC, OBE, MC (1923-2000), long-serving president of the Returned and Services League (RSL), grew up in Bombala.
 Dick Tooth (1929-), former Australian rugby union representative, born in Bombala.
 William Farmer Whyte (1877-1958), journalist and author
 Charles Henry Kerry (1857-1928), photographer
 Wilfred Alexander de Beuzeville (1884-1954), forester

References

External links 

 Bombala Railway Station

Towns in New South Wales
Snowy Monaro Regional Council
Proposed sites for national capital of Australia